Auto Trader or AutoTrader may refer to:

 Autotrader.com, an American automobile sales website
 AutoTrader.ca, a Canadian automobile sales website
 Auto Trader Group, a British automobile sales website
 AutoTrader.co.za, a South African automobile sales website, which was previously a subsidiary of the Auto Trader Group
 Auto Trader (TV series), television programme on the Discovery Channel in the United Kingdom